The 2024 Alabama Republican presidential primary will be held on March 5, 2024, as part of the Republican Party primaries for the 2024 presidential election. 49 delegates to the 2024 Republican National Convention will be allocated on a winner-take-most basis. The contest will be held on Super Tuesday alongside primaries in 14 other states.

Background 
In the 2016 Republican presidential contest, Donald Trump won the Alabama primary with 42.4% of the vote, with his nearest opponent, Senator Ted Cruz, taking 21.1% of the vote.

Republican electorate 
The Alabama Republican Party electorate is predominantly evangelical. In 2012, an estimated 80% of Alabama Republican primary voters were affiliated with evangelical Christianity. In the 2008 and 2012 Alabama Republican presidential primaries, social conservative candidates Mike Huckabee and Rick Santorum, respectively, won by dominating the evangelical vote.

Candidates 
Former president Donald Trump and former South Carolina governor and U.S. Ambassador to the United Nations Nikki Haley are the only main contenders to officially announce their candidacy so far, although Florida governor Ron DeSantis is widely expected to announce his candidacy as soon as May 2023.

Campaign 
Donald Trump's 2024 presidential campaign was endorsed by Alabama's senior senator Tommy Tuberville in November 2022. Former Vice President Mike Pence, who is reportedly considering a presidential candidacy, is set to speak before the University of Alabama's Young Americans for Freedom (YAF) chapter in April 2023.

Endorsements

Polling

See also 
 2024 Republican Party presidential primaries
 2024 United States presidential election
 2024 United States presidential election in Alabama
 2024 United States elections

Notes

References 

Republican presidential primary
Alabama
Alabama Republican primaries